Jonathan Glazer (born 26 March 1965) is an English film director and screenwriter. Born in London, Glazer began his career in theatre before transitioning into film. Over the course of a career spanning nearly three decades, Glazer's directing work includes feature films, short films, music videos, and commercials.

Glazer has been nominated for two BAFTA Awards and twice for both the Golden Lion and the Grand Jury Prize at the Venice Film Festival. He also received the nomination for the MTV Video Music Award for Best Direction twice, consecutively for his work on Jamiroquai's "Virtual Insanity" and Radiohead's "Karma Police". His work is often characterized by depictions of flawed and desperate characters, explorations of themes such as alienation and loneliness, a bold visual style that utilizes an omniscient perspective, and dramatic use of music. His 2013 film Under the Skin received numerous accolades and awards and was included in BBC's 100 Greatest Films of the 21st Century list.

Early life
Jonathan Glazer was born into a Jewish family in London and attended school in Hadley, a district of the Borough of Barnet. His father was a cinephile with whom he frequently watched David Lean movies. After graduating from college with an emphasis in theatre design from Nottingham Trent University, Glazer began his career directing theatre and making film and television trailers, including award-winning work for the BBC.

Career
In 1993, Glazer wrote and directed three short films of his own ("Mad", "Pool", and "Commission"), and joined Academy Commercials, a production company based in Central London. He has directed acclaimed campaigns for Guinness (Dreamer, Swimblack, and Surfer) and Stella Artois (Devil's Island).  Since the mid-1990s he has directed a number of significant music videos, and was named MTV Director of the Year 1997. He named his video for Radiohead's 1996 single "Street Spirit" as a "turning point" in his work: "I knew when I finished that, because [Radiohead] found their own voices as an artist, at that point, I felt like I got close to whatever mine was, and I felt confident that I could do things that emoted, that had some kind of poetic as well as prosaic value. That for me was a key moment."

In 2000, he directed his first feature, the critically acclaimed British gangster film Sexy Beast, starring Ray Winstone and Ben Kingsley, the latter of whom received a nomination for the Academy Award for Best Supporting Actor. In 2004, he directed his second feature film Birth, starring Nicole Kidman in the United States.

In 2001, Glazer directed the "Odyssey" spot for Levi Strauss Jeans. In 2006, he directed the second Sony BRAVIA TV advertisement, which took 10 days and 250 people to film. It was filmed at an estate in Glasgow, and featured paint exploding all over the tower blocks. Later the same year he was commissioned to make a television advert for the new Motorola Red phone. The advertisement, showing two naked black bodies emerging from a lump of flesh rotating on a potter's wheel, was due to air in September 2006 but was shelved by Motorola. The advertisement was to benefit several charities in Africa.

In 2013, he directed Under the Skin, a loose adaptation of Michel Faber's science fiction novel of the same name starring Scarlett Johansson. The film premiered at the 2013 Telluride Film Festival and received a theatrical release in 2014, garnering critical acclaim. The film was named the best film of 2014 by numerous critics and publications, was included in many best-of-the-decade lists, and ranked 61st on the BBC's 100 Greatest Films of the 21st Century list, an international poll of 177 top critics. Under the Skin is the subject of a 2019 non-fiction book entitled Alien in the Mirror: Scarlett Johansson, Jonathan Glazer and Under the Skin by author Maureen Foster, an in-depth analysis of the film scene-by-scene and behind-the-scenes.

In October 2019 it was reported that Glazer was working on a new feature film based loosely on Martin Amis’s novel The Zone of Interest, to be co-produced and distributed in the US by A24.

Filmography

Feature films
 Sexy Beast (2000)
 Birth (2004)
 Under the Skin (2013)
 The Zone of Interest (TBA)

Short films
 The Fall (2019)
 Strasbourg 1518 (2020)
 First Light: Alexander McQueen (2020)

Music videos

 "Karmacoma" by Massive Attack (1995)
 "The Universal" by Blur (1995)
 "Street Spirit (Fade Out)" by Radiohead (1996)
 "Virtual Insanity" by Jamiroquai (1996)
 "Cosmic Girl" (cancelled) by Jamiroquai (1997)
 "Into My Arms" by Nick Cave and the Bad Seeds (1997)
 "Karma Police" by Radiohead (1997)
 "Rabbit in Your Headlights" by UNKLE ft. Thom Yorke (1998)
 "A Song for the Lovers" by Richard Ashcroft (2000)
 "Money to Burn" (cancelled) by Richard Ashcroft (2000)
 "Live with Me" by Massive Attack (2006)
 "Treat Me Like Your Mother" by The Dead Weather (2009)

Commercials
 Kodak: "Husband to Be"
 Pretty Polly: "Linda 2"
 Mazda: "Shock of the New"
 AT&T: "Chief Executive's Wife"
 Club Med: "City"
 AT&T: "Sales Director"
 Nike: "Frozen Moment" (1996)
 Caffrey's: "New York"
 Nike: "Parklife" (1997)
 Guinness: "Swimblack" (May 1998)
 BT Easyreach: "Lamppost" (October 1998)
 Guinness: "Surfer" (March 1999)
 Levi Strauss: "Kung Fu" (January 2000)
 Stella Artois (January 2000):
"Last Orders"
"Devil's Island"
 Volkswagen Polo: "Protection" (January 2000)
 Wrangler: "Whatever You Ride" (May 2000)
 Guinness: "Dreamer" (April 2001)
 Levi Strauss: "Odyssey" (January 2002)
 Barclays (January 2003):
"Evil"
"Bull"
"Chicken"
 Band Aid 20 (December 2004):
 "Bar"
 "Double Don"
 "Rant"
 "Razor"
 Stella Artois: "Ice Skating Priests" (April 2006)
 Sony BRAVIA: "Paint" (October 2006)
 Motorola Red: "Clay" (December 2006)
 Cadbury's Flake: "Temptation" '' (March 2010)
 Sony 3D: "Kaka" (June 2010)
 Volkswagen Polo: "Last Tango in Compton" (November 2010)
 Audi: "The Ring" (August 2013)
 Apple Inc.: "Flight" (June 2019)

Idents
 Channel 4 presentation (September 2015)

References

External links
 
 Interview with Jonathan Glazer (Directors Label DVD) by Daniel Robert Epstein for Suicide Girls

1965 births
Living people
English music video directors
English film directors
English screenwriters
English male screenwriters
Television commercial directors
Writers from London
Alumni of Nottingham Trent University
English Jewish writers